Battle of Malatya -(Azerbaijani:Malatya döyüşü)(Turkish:Malatya savaşı) On August 1, 1473, a battle took place between the Aqqoyunlu and the Ottomans in Malatya.  As a result of the tactics chosen by Uzun Hasan, the Aqqoyunlu cavalry deceived the Ottoman army and retreated to the left bank of the Euphrates, where  Khassa Murad was defeated.  The Ottoman sultan sent one of his officers to the ruler of Aqqoyunlu to make peace.  However, the ruler of Aqqoyunlu did not accept this offer and began to move in the direction of Tarjan.

Battle 
In the spring of 1472, the Aqqoyunlu state, which had started a war against the Ottomans, conducted military operations, captured Tokat, Caesarea, Aksaray and Akşehir, and entered Karaman.  However, the tired Aqqoyunlu cavalry, separated from the main forces, suffered a big defeat near Lake Beyshehir.  Due to the winter, both sides stopped the operation. Hassa Murad sent a letter to Uzun Hasan.  In the spring of 1473, he announced that he would go on a campaign against him.

In 1473, two armies clashed on the Euphrates. The number of the Aqqoyunlu army was 70,000, and the number of the Ottomans was Unknown Successful Muhammad led the central part of the army.  Before the battle began, he ambushed the Ottomans with 10,000 cavalry. The Ottoman commander Khassa Murad attacked with his main forces. From the very first attack, the Ottoman army, which had been ambushed by the successful Muhammad, was besieged. Thus, the Ottoman army, deceived and defeated on the left bank of the river, suffered 4,000 casualties and retreated.  Omar Bey and several Ottoman commanders were captured.

References

Battles involving the Ottoman Empire
Conflicts in 1473
Battles of the Aq Qoyunlu